Time Lapse is a 2014 American indie sci-fi thriller directed by  Bradley D. King and starring Danielle Panabaker, Matt O'Leary, and George Finn. King's directorial debut, it centers upon a group of friends who discover a machine that can take pictures of things 24 hours into the future, causing increasingly complex causal loops. It premiered on April 18, 2014 at the Brussels International Fantastic Film Festival.

Plot
Finn (Matt O'Leary) is a painter with a creative block, who lives together with his girlfriend Callie (Danielle Panabaker) and his best friend Jasper (George Finn) in an apartment complex where Finn works as a manager. Because elderly tenant Mr. Bezzerides (informally called "Mr. B" by the protagonists) has not paid his rent in two months, Callie checks on him, and discovers a strange machine in his apartment that takes Polaroid photos of their living room's picture window—apparently 24 hours in the future, always at 8 pm, although Mr. B's photo display includes daytime photos and is missing some photos. The friends check Mr. B's storage unit and find his inexplicably charred corpse; he has apparently been dead for a week. Gambling addict Jasper pushes to use the machine to win bets but loses, and the next day's photo confirms they will do just that. It also shows that Finn has finally created a new painting; copying the work in the photo gets him past his block. Based on what happened to Mr. B and notes in his journal, they theorize that they have to make sure the events in the photos—whatever they may be—have to occur, or their timeline will stop, and they will therefore cease to be.

Several days go by. The friends cover up Mr. B's disappearance, including lying to the complex security guard, Big Joe, claiming the old man is in the hospital. After a week they get a disturbing photo: Callie kissing Jasper, while Finn paints in the background. Feeling that they have to do what's in the photos, they pose at 8pm the following night.  But the actual kiss goes on too long while Finn paints, and he gets angry and jealous.

The next photo shows Jasper's violent bookie Ivan at the apartment. Not knowing why he would be there, Jasper calls him the next morning, saying he won't be making any bets that day. The call raises Ivan's suspicions and he visits Jasper that night, learning of the machine. Ivan forces the friends to now pose for the photos with many more event results for Ivan to make bets on. Finn and Jasper's friendship is strained by these events, as Ivan will be keeping each night's photo, preventing Finn from seeing his painting. Jasper manages to get a cellphone picture of the next photo before giving it to Ivan's goon, Marcus. This photo shows a hastily made skull and crossbones on the canvas, which Jasper believes is a warning to themselves, so he hides weapons (a kitchen knife, golf club, and hammer) near the couch.

The next evening, Finn runs into Big Joe at the gate, who has just gotten a job as a police officer. Marcus sees their meeting and calls Ivan, who does not believe their story about Big Joe. Ivan threatens all of them, but Jasper convinces him that tonight's new photo is of Ivan's death at Marcus' hands. While Ivan is retrieving the photo, Jasper stabs Marcus, then clubs Ivan to death on his return. They hide the bodies in Mr. B's storage unit. Finn and Callie fight, so Finn sleeps on the couch. Later that night, they are visited by Mr. B's colleague, Dr. Heidecker, who is looking for Mr. B.  Finn and Jasper can't keep their stories straight about Mr. B, so Dr. Heidecker levels a gun at them and forces them to confess. Mr. B had mailed Heidecker a photo that covers the next night, but taken before his death, meaning that the machine could be set to take photos more than 24 hours in advance. The photo shows blood on the window, Mr. B's hat on the friends' couch (Jasper has taken to wearing the dead man's hat), and a picture of a green coil that resembles the broken device on the ground next to Mr. B's corpse. Dr. Heidecker theorizes that "time" did not kill Mr. B for trying to change the future - he knocked over a coil in his storage unit and the released gas killed him. As she does not know how to adjust the settings of the machine, Jasper shoots Heidecker dead using Ivan's gun.

The next night's photo shows Callie and Jasper having sex in the window with Finn unconscious on the couch. Finn talks with Jasper to try to devise a means to prevent events, but Jasper knocks him out and locks him in Mr. B's storage unit—he does not believe Dr. Heidecker's theory and intends to prevent a paradox, making sure the photo happens, no matter what. Trying to find a way out of the locked storage unit, he searches Heidecker's purse and finds the photo that includes blood on the window, Mr B's hat on the couch, and the painting of the coil, and realizes that he had to have painted the coil in the future the next day so that Mr. B would die in the storage room in the first place, thus allowing him to escape using Mr. B's keys. He escapes and goes to the machine. He calls Jasper, who sees him at the machine, and threatens to destroy it if Jasper does not stop. A fight ensues, culminating with Callie smashing Jasper's head in. When making the painting to match Heidecker's photo, Finn realizes a discrepancy. He discovers that the camera also takes a photo at 8 am, a truth which Callie kept to herself. Callie reveals that she has been using the morning photo to send herself messages to manipulate events and rekindle her relationship with Finn; the sex photo is one of those missing from Mr. B's wall, from a drunken night a month ago (the other missing photos are ones of Callie and Jasper being affectionate, which she took down from the wall when she first discovered the machine). Finn rejects Callie and goes to destroy the machine, so she shoots him, creating the blood splatter on the window from Heidecker's photo - she thinks that if she sends herself a message in the window when the photo is taken, it will send a message to herself 24 hours ago, preventing these events from happening. While Callie is attempting to tape a note to herself on the window, Big Joe stops by, discovers the murdered Jasper and Finn, and arrests her.

As Callie is led away by Joe - confident that the timeline will reset - the note she left falls off the window, making permanent the events that have taken place. The camera takes the photo that Mr. B had mailed to Heidecker before he died, and generates another photo, which is left unrevealed.

Cast
Danielle Panabaker as Callie
Matt O'Leary as Finn
George Finn as Jasper
Amin Joseph as Big Joe
Jason Spisak as Ivan
David Figlioli as Marcus
Sharon Maughan as Dr. Heidecker
Judith Drake as Mrs. Anderson
John Rhys-Davies as Mr. Bezzerides

Influences
The premise of being able to see 24 hours into the future is also the basis of several other movies and television shows: Who is Running?, Early Edition, The Queer Story of Brownlow's Newspaper a story by H. G. Wells which was made into an episode of The Infinite Worlds of H. G. Wells, and Paradox.

The relationship dynamics among the three main characters and the single location in Time Lapse are also drawn from Danny Boyle's 1994 film Shallow Grave. As a low-budget drama focused on time paradox, it has been compared with Shane Carruth's Primer.

Time Lapse also has several elements in common with episode 46 of The Twilight Zone called "A Most Unusual Camera": there are 3 protagonists, two male and one female, they come in possession of a camera that can take pictures of 5 minutes into the future and they also happen to use it to win money from horse races.

Reception
Critical reception for Time Lapse has been positive. On review aggregation website Rotten Tomatoes, the film holds an approval rating of 76% based on 17 reviews, with an average rating of 6.05/10.

Bloody Disgusting praised the film, and The Hollywood Reporter complimented it for making "the most of a simple brain-teasing premise". The Digital Journal also praised the movie, writing "It’s not unconventional or particularly ground-breaking, but it is a solid piece of storytelling." Variety also reviewed the movie positively, stating that "the pic never feels claustrophobic despite largely being confined to the protagonists’ flat. All tech/design contributions are savvy but unobtrusive, never wresting attention from an ingenious narrative measured out in unhurried yet always-engaging terms."

Awards
Best Actor/Actress for Danielle Panabaker at the London Independent Film Festival (2014, won)
Best Feature at the Fantaspoa International Fantastic Film Festival (2014, won)
Best Feature at the Thriller Chiller Film Festival (2014, won)
Best Feature at the Portsmouth International Film Festival (2014, won)
Best Feature at the Atlanta Underground Film Festival (2014, won)
Best Feature at the Burbank International Film Festival (2014, won)
Best Feature at the Austin Other Worlds (2014, won)
Best International Feature at the London Independent Film Festival (2014, won)
Best Foreign Feature at the Fantafestival (2014, won)
Best Drama Feature at the Atlanta Horror Film Festival (2014, won)
Best Feature Audience Award at the Ithaca International Fantastic Film Festival (2014, won)
Best International Sci-Fi Feature at the Trieste Science+Fiction Festival (2014, won)
Best Sci-Fi Feature at the Feratum Film Festival (2014, won)
Golden Honu Award for Best Feature at the Big Island Film Festival (2014, won)
Best Horror/Sci-Fi Feature at the Crystal Palace International Film Festival (2014, won)
Shriekfest Award for Best SciFi Feature at the Shriekfest (2014, won)
Vortex Grand Prize Best Sci-Fi Feature at the Rhode Island International Horror Festival (2014, won)
Best Screenplay at the Maverick Movie Awards (2014, won)
Best Screenplay at the Orlando Film Festival (2014, won)
Best Screenplay at the Austin Other Worlds (2014, won)
Best International Screenplay at the Rojo Sangre Film Festival (2014, won)
Indie Cities Breakthrough Film at the Twin Cities Film Festival (2014, won)

References

External links
 
 
 
 
 

2014 films
2010s science fiction films
Films shot in Los Angeles
Prediction in popular culture
2014 directorial debut films
American science fiction films
2010s English-language films
2010s American films